Dean Edward Marney (born 31 January 1984) is an English professional footballer who plays as a midfielder and last played for Fleetwood Town.

Club career

Tottenham Hotspur
Born in Barking, London, Marney is a box-to-box midfielder and a product of the Tottenham Hotspur youth system. Although predominantly a midfielder he showed an aptitude at right back and understudied to then Spurs right back Stephen Carr, and was viewed by many as the Irish international's natural successor. He really emerged onto the scene in a mid season friendly against Irish champions Bohemians putting in a man of the match performance from right back. Unable to get his start as a young player in the Tottenham team, he was loaned out early on in his career to Swindon Town.

His initial first team action for Spurs came in August 2003, against Birmingham City. By January 2004 he had joined Queens Park Rangers on loan, as by that time Spurs had strengthened their strike force. Upon his return he was handed his debut start, but that would be his only appearance until November 2004, when he joined Gillingham on loan.

When he returned to Tottenham, he was immediately thrown in at the deep end, as a last minute choice to face an Everton team on 1 January 2005, in which he scored the first and last goals of the match in a 5–2 victory, the second being a superb 25-yard curler into the top right corner.

He struggled with form until February 2005, the month in which he participated in his only international, an England under-21 match versus the Netherlands.
After considerable squad strengthening in the early part of the 2005–06 season, which included the signings of Edgar Davids and Jermaine Jenas, he found himself out of action, and moved for a season-long loan to Norwich City in the hope of winning them promotion back to the Premier League. However his time at Norwich City was cut short due to injury and he returned to Tottenham on 31 October 2005.

Hull City
Phil Parkinson made Marney his second signing for Hull City on 14 July 2006 for an undisclosed fee.

Burnley
Burnley manager Brian Laws made Marney his first summer signing on 28 May 2010. Marney scored his first goal for Burnley in a 3–3 draw with Sheffield United on 16 October 2010.

Marney struggled to establish himself in the Burnley team in his first season at the club, having spells in and out of the side. For the opening few games of his second season, Marney found himself out of favour and used predominantly as a substitute. However, a string of impressive performances from the midfielder saw him given an extended run in the side and Marney finished the season as one of the Claret's most impressive performers. The 2012–13 season is considered by many to be the best of Marney's career, being an almost ever-present in the Clarets side missing matches only through suspension and injury. Marney helped Burnley stave off relegation and eventually finish 11th in the Championship .

Marney began the 2013–14 season in a similar vein, performing very well during pre-season and the opening matches of the Football League Championship, where he formed an effective partnership with former Wolves and Wigan Athletic midfielder, David Jones, who signed for the Clarets in the summer. Over his first three seasons with Burnley, he appeared in approximately 75% of their league games and, with his contract about to expire in 2013, signed a new two-year deal. At the end of the 2017–18 season, he was released by Burnley after eight years at the club and having made over 220 appearances.

Fleetwood Town

In July 2018, Marney joined Fleetwood Town, taking the squad number 25.
In July 2020, Marney was released by Fleetwood Town at the end of his contract.

International career
Marney represented England at international gaining one cap for the England under-21 side in England's 2–1 defeat to Netherlands U-21 in February 2005. He has not appeared for England since then.

Style of play
Marney is a free-flowing midfielder and has proven to be a key factor in distribution throughout the teams he has played for. While at Burnley, he developed a reputation as something of a 'hard man', picking up 12 yellow cards and 1 red card in the 2012–13 season, a figure higher than all of his team-mates and the second highest in the Championship. He is confident in challenging for the ball but shows good control of his aggression.

Career statistics

Honours
Hull City
Championship play-offs: 2007–08

Burnley
Championship: 2015–16

References

External links

Career information at ex-canaries.co.uk

1984 births
Living people
Footballers from Barking, London
English footballers
England under-21 international footballers
Association football midfielders
Tottenham Hotspur F.C. players
Swindon Town F.C. players
Queens Park Rangers F.C. players
Gillingham F.C. players
Norwich City F.C. players
Hull City A.F.C. players
Burnley F.C. players
Fleetwood Town F.C. players
Premier League players
English Football League players